Xuande (8 February 1426 – 17 January 1436)  was the era name of the Xuande Emperor, the fifth emperor of the Ming dynasty of China, and was used for a total of 10 years.

On 7 February 1435 (Xuande 10, 10th day of the 1st month), Emperor Yingzong ascended to the throne and continued to use. The era was changed to Zhengtong in the following year.

Comparison table

Other regime era names that existed during the same period
 Vietnam
 Thiên Khánh (天慶, 1426–1428): Jiaozhi Province — era name of Trần Cảo
 Thuận Thiên (順天, 1428–1433): Later Lê dynasty — era name of Lê Thái Tổ 
 Thiệu Bình (紹平, 1434–1439): Later Lê dynasty — era name of Lê Thái Tông
 Japan
 Ōei (応永, 1394–1428): era name of Emperor Go-Komatsu and Emperor Shōkō
 Shōchō (正長, 1428–1429): era name of Emperor Shōkō and Emperor Go-Hanazono
 Eikyō (永享, 1429–1441):  era name of Emperor Go-Hanazono

See also
 List of Chinese era names
 List of Ming dynasty era names

References

Further reading

Ming dynasty eras